This is a list of terms and symbols used in scientific names for organisms, and in describing the names.  For proper parts of the names themselves, see List of Latin and Greek words commonly used in systematic names. Note that many of the abbreviations are used with or without a stop.

Naming standards and taxonomic organizations and their codes and taxonomies
 ICTV – International Committee on Taxonomy of Viruses
 ICSP – International Committee on Systematics of Prokaryotes
 formerly the ICSB – International Committee on Systematic Bacteriology
 publishes the ICNP – International Code of Nomenclature of Prokaryotes
 formerly the International Code of Nomenclature of Bacteria (ICNB) or Bacteriological Code (BC)
 ICZN – International Commission on Zoological Nomenclature
 publishes ICZN the International Code of Zoological Nomenclature or "ICZN Code"
 IBC – International Botanical Congress
 publishes ICN the International Code of Nomenclature for algae, fungi, and plants
 formerly ICBN or the International Code of Botanical Nomenclature (current version the Shenzhen Code)
 also publishes ICNCP or the International Code of Nomenclature for Cultivated Plants
 IAPT – International Association for Plant Taxonomy
 publishes Taxon
 also publishes Regnum Vegetabile which contains the IBC's ICN, the Index Nominum Genericorum, and the Index Herbariorum

General terms

 clade, cladistics
 phylum, phylogeny
 taxon, taxonomy; Taxon is a journal of the IAPT, where proposals are made
 synonym : a name for a taxon different from the currently accepted name
 pro parte (abbreviation p. p.; "for part" in Latin)
 senior synonym, (zoology) : the earliest (correctly published) name
 junior synonym, (zoology) : any later name
 homotypic synonym (botany)
 heterotypic synonym (botany) : (or taxonomic synonym)  a synonym that comes into being when a taxon is reduced in status ("reduced to synonymy") and becomes part of a different taxon; the zoological equivalent is "subjective synonym"
 objective synonym (zoology)
 subjective synonym (zoology): see taxonomic synonym
 taxonomic synonym (botany): see taxonomic synonym
 basionym or basyonym (botany), or protonym or original combination (zoology): original name on which the current name is based; in bacteriology "basonym"
 combinatio nova (comb. nov.) : new combination; when a taxon has been given a new name, preserving one of the previous components
 status novus (abbr. stat. nov.) : new status; when a taxon has been given a new rank
 homonym : names spelled identically, but, in some codes, names spelled similarly, as defined by the code
 senior homonym (zoology) : the first legitimate use of the name which generally takes priority
 junior homonym (zoology), later homonym (botany) : a later and generally illegitimate use, though in some circumstances the later name is allowed to stand
 hemihomonym: a homonym across naming authorities that is permitted because any confusion is improbable
 parahomonym: names that are similar enough to be likely to be confused
 isonym (botany) an identical name based on the same type, but published later
 Principle of the First Reviser
 Principle of Priority
 Principle of Typification
 taxonomic authority
 binomial authority
 binomial nomenclature (also "binominal")
 trinomial nomenclature (also "trinominal")
 hybrid name (botany) : either two parent binomials, separated by a "×" (q.v.) or a given binomial, with or without an intercalated "×"
 chresonym published usage of a name.
 orthochresonym
 heterochresonym
 taxon (plural "taxa")
 wastebasket taxon (also "wastebin taxon", "dustbin taxon" or "catch-all taxon")
 form taxon
 Lazarus taxon
 Elvis taxon
 sister taxon
 zombie taxon
 node-based taxon
 parataxon
 ichnotaxon (ichnogenus (igen.), ichnospecies (isp.), etc.) : a taxon (genus, species, etc.) only known by its work, e.g. footprints, nests, or bite marks
 ootaxon (oospecies, etc.) : a taxon known from fossil eggs
 sciotaxon a taxon known from partial evidence but believed to be identical to an orthotaxon
 polyphyletic taxon
 monophyletic taxon : a taxon consisting of a common ancestor and all its lineal descendants; a clade
 paraphyletic taxon
 species complex : a group of closely related species very similar in appearance, generally constituting a monophyletic taxon
 species aggregate or aggregate species : a grouping of closely related species that are treated like a single species for practical purposes
 alliance : a group of species or genera that have at some time been considered provisionally related
 conspecific : of the same species; e. g. of two taxa previously thought to be different species
 congeners : items of the same genus
 circumscription : the limits of a taxon as made evident by its recognized constituency; a taxon may accordingly be circumscribed differently by different authorities if they recognize different constituents
(in the strict sense),  (in a broad sense), etc.; see sensu for more variants and details
 secundum ("following" in Latin) : e. g. "secundum Smith"
 form classification

Types
 Type
 Type genus
 Type series
 Type species
 Type specimen
 Allotype : a designated type of opposite sex to the holotype
 Clonotype
 Epitype : an additional or clarifying type
 Ergatotype
 Hapantotype
 Holotype
 Isotype : a type identical to the holotype
 Isolectotype :
 Lectotype a type specimen selected from a group of syntypes
 Name-bearing type
 Neotype : a replacement for the holotype
 Paralectotype : a remaining syntype once the lectotype and any isolectotypes are excluded (bot.)
 Paratype : a member of a type series apart from the holotype or isotype (zoology); a syntype that is not a member of the type series (botany)
 Syntype : a specimen cited in the original description of the taxon (botany)
 Type locality or location: where the type specimen was found
 Type host: in parasitology, the host species from which the type specimen was recovered

Rank names

The main ranks are kingdom (regnum), phylum or division (divisio), class (classis), order (ordo), family (familia), genus and species.  The ranks of section and series are also used in botany for groups within genera, while section is used in zoology for a division of an order. Further levels in the hierarchy can be made by the addition of prefixes such as sub-, super-, infra-, and so on.

Divisions such as "morph", "form", "variety", "strain", "breed", "cultivar", hybrid (nothospecies) and "landrace" are used to describe various sub-specific groups in different fields.

It is possible for a clade to be unranked, for example Psoroptidia (Yunker, 1955) and the SAR supergroup.  Sometimes a rank is described as clade where the traditional hierarchy cannot accommodate them.

Latin descriptions of names or taxa
Note that in zoology the English descriptions, such as "conserved name", for example, are acceptable and generally used.  These descriptions can be classified between accepted names (nom. cons., nom. nov., nom. prot.) and unaccepted combinations for different reasons (nom. err., nom. illeg., nom. nud., nom. rej., nom. supp., nom. van.), with some cases in between regarding the use (nom. dub.: used but not fully accepted; nom. obl.: accepted but not fully used, so it yields precedence to a nom. prot).

 Candidatus (Ca.) - a taxon proposed from incomplete information, such as uncultured bacteria known from metagenomics
 ex errore – made in error
 incertae sedis – of uncertain placement
 nomen alternativum (nom. alt.; plural: nomina alternativa) – an alternative name, as for certain plant families 
 nomen conservandum (nom. cons.; plural: nomina conservanda) – a conserved name
 nomen dubium (nom. dub.; plural: nomina dubia) (zoo. bact. bot.(informal)) – a name of questionable application
 nomen ambiguum (plural: nomina ambigua), (bot.) a name that has been used with more than one meaning
 nomen confusum (plural: nomina confusa), (bact.) a name based on a mixed bacterial culture
 nomen perplexum (plural: nomina perplexa), a name confusingly similar to another name or names
 nomen periculosum (plural: nomina periculosa), an name which can lead to dangerous outcomes, through confusion
 nomen erratum (nom. err.; plural: nomina errata) - a name given in error
 nomen illegitimum (nom. illeg.; plural: nomina illegitima) – an illegitimate name
 nomen invalidum (nom. inval.; plural: nomina invalida) – an invalid name
 nomen manuscriptum -  a name that appears in a manuscript
 nomen monstrositatum (nom. monstr.) – a name based on a monstrosity (fasciation, phyllody or similar deformities)
 nomen novum (nom. nov.; plural: nomina nova) – a replacement name
 nomen nudum (nom. nud.; plural: nomina nuda) – a name published without an accompanying description
 nomen oblitum (nom. obl.; plural: nomina oblita) – a name which has been overlooked (literally, forgotten) and is no longer valid
 nomen protectum (nom. prot.; plural: nomina protecta) – a name granted protection
 nomen rejiciendum (nom. rej.; plural: nomina rejicienda) – a name that has been rejected and cannot be used
 nomen suppressum (nom. supp.; plural: nomina suppressa) – a name that has been suppressed and cannot be used
 nomen vanum (plural: nomina vana) - not a useful term, has been used to mean either a nomen dubium (see above in this list), or an invalid change in spelling, better called an unjustified emendation
 species inquirenda, a species of doubtful identity requiring further investigation

Latin abbreviations

 cf. : confer; literally "compare", indicates approximate placement
 f. : forma; form
 nothovar. : nothovarietas; hybrid variety
 nob. : nobis): by us, indicates the writers are the authority of a scientific name
 p. p. : pro parte; "for part"
 pro syn. : pro synonymo; "as synonym"
 sensu auct. : sensu auctorum; in the sense of certain authors (generally referring to an invalid usage)
 s.l. : sensu lato; in the broad (loose) sense
 sp. (plural spp.) : species (identical in English)
  sp. nov. (plural spp. nov.) : species nova (species novae) : new species (singular)
 s.s. : sensu stricto; in the strict (narrow or precise) sense
 ssp. (plural sspp. or subspp) : subspecies (identical in English)
 subf. : subforma; subform
 subsp. (plural subspp.) : subspecies (identical in English)
 subvar. : subvarietas; subvariety
 var. : varietas; variety

English abbreviations
 bot. - botany
 zoo. - zoology

Symbols
 × : cross; indicates a hybrid
 † : extinct
 + : graft or chimera; indicates a graft hybrid

See also
 Alpha taxonomy
 Cladistics
 Glossary of botanical terms
 Species description

References

Naming
Scientific naming
scientific naming
Wikipedia glossaries using unordered lists